On Wong (1840 – December 16, 1936), more commonly known as Ah Louis, was a Chinese American banker, labor contractor, farmer, and shopkeeper in San Luis Obispo, California, during the late 19th and early 20th century. His Ah Louis Store building is on the National Register of Historic Places. Ah Louis was a central figure in the development of the Central Coast of California, serving as an organizer of Chinese laborers during the construction of the Pacific Coast Railway's Avila—Port Harford spur and the tunnels  through Cuesta Grade over the Santa Lucia Range.

History 

Ah Louis traveled from his home in Guangdong Province, (today's) Greater Taishan Region, China, and arrived in California between 1856 and 1861 in order to strike it rich during the California Gold Rush.  Unsuccessful at mining, he became a laborer working in Corvallis, Oregon, and further south.

Wong settled in San Luis Obispo, California, in 1870, and was working as a cook in a hotel there in 1871. Soon he began to organize work-crews to help construct the Pacific Coast Railroad, delivering 160 Chinese Americans from San Francisco by schooner.
In 1877, Ah Louis was awarded two large road construction contracts, including a road from Paso Robles, California to Cambria, California (now the westernmost portion of State Route 46) and the first stages of a road connecting San Luis Obispo to Paso Robles, California (now referred to as Cuesta Grade, a portion of which is still drivable and is labeled off the freeway as "Old Stagecoach Road" and a portion of U.S. Route 101).  In 1884, Wong received the contract to construct the four Cuesta Grade tunnels for the Southern Pacific Railroad's coast route, requiring the provision of 2,000 laborers and taking ten years to complete.

Store
Seeing a need for the California Central Coast's Chinese community, Ah opened a small East Asian mercantile in 1874, the first in San Luis Obispo County, from which he sold goods, including rice, rum, and opium (opium use was legal until 1915).
The wooden structure was replaced by a sturdy brick building in 1885, made from bricks from his own brickyard, at 800 Palm Street on the corner of Chorro Street in downtown San Luis Obispo, marking where San Luis Obispo's  Chinatown once stood. The shop is owned by William Watson, Ah Louis's great-grandson,
and the ground floor is now operated as a retail store.

The Ah Louis store has been designated as a California State Historical Landmark number 802; and recognized by the United States National Park Service  being also listed on the National Register of Historic Places.

Family
Ah Louis married his first wife in China in 1860. She was in California in 1868, but returned to China about 1873. Wong last saw her in China in 1888. The 1880 census shows a wife living with him, but no children are shown.
In May 1889, Ah Louis married Eng Gon Ying (Silver Dove) in San Francisco. Together they raised their eight children (five sons and three daughters) in their residence above the Ah Louis Store.

In 1909 Eng Gon Ying Louis was murdered by Willie Wong, Ah Louis' son from his first marriage.
In December 1932, accompanied by sons Fred and Howard,
Ah Louis returned to China, intending to visit family and to follow the tradition of dying where one was born. Disappointed with the lack of progress and modern technology and the high rate of banditry, Ah decided to return to San Luis Obispo.  He died on December 18, 1936.

The youngest and last surviving of Ah Louis' children, Howard Louis, who had a degree in economics and fought with Gen. George Patton, continued to run the store until the late 1990s and died on August 15, 2008, at the age of 100. The store was damaged from the San Simeon earthquake in 2003 and afterwards condemned by the City of San Luis Obispo. Around this time, the store was fully acquired by William J. Watson, MD, who restored the building and its interior. It was placed on the National Register of Historic Places in 2008.

See also 
 City of San Luis Obispo Historic Resources
 Murder of Gon Ying Louis

References

External links 
Louis Family Papers at Cal Poly, San Luis Obispo
Ah Louis Store records, 1886-1890 housed at Stanford Libraries
Historical Marker Database
Chinese Contributions to San Luis Obispo County
Chinese Pioneer Timeline
Brief History of San Luis Obispo's Chinese
San Luis Obispo: a history in architecture by Janet Penn Franks, 2004
Preliminary Report on December 22, 2003 San Simeon Earthquake Ah Louis Store on pages 10–11
Article on Ah Louis Family's personal letters in Chinese

Qing dynasty emigrants to the United States
Chinese-American history
1840 births
1936 deaths
Buildings and structures in San Luis Obispo, California
History of San Luis Obispo County, California
California Historical Landmarks
National Register of Historic Places in San Luis Obispo County, California